The Moto E7 (stylized by Motorola as moto e7) is the 7th generation of the low-end Moto E family of Android smartphones developed by Motorola Mobility.

Submodels comparison

References 

Android (operating system) devices

Motorola smartphones
Mobile phones introduced in 2020
Mobile phones with multiple rear cameras